Walbrzych Voivodeship was a unit of administrative division and local government in Poland in the years 1975–1998, superseded by the Lower Silesian Voivodeship.

Major cities and towns (population in 1995)
 Wałbrzych (139,600)
 Świdnica (64,800)
 Dzierżoniów (38,300)
 Bielawa (34,600)
 Kłodzko (30,900)
 Nowa Ruda (27,200)
 Świebodzice (24,700)

See also
 Voivodeships of Poland

Former voivodeships of Poland (1975–1998)